Walter Kuno Reinhold Gustav von Bülow-Bothkamp (alternate spelling Bothcamp) (24 April 1894 – 6 January 1918), Pour le Merite, Military Order of Saint Henry, Iron Cross was a German fighter ace from an aristocratic family who was credited with 28 victories. After entering World War I as a hussar, he transferred to the Imperial German Air Service. Although flying a reconnaissance airplane, he managed to down two enemy planes in France in October 1915. He was then transferred to Palestine for 1916; he scored two more victories there. He returned to the Western Front to join Jagdstaffel 18, a fighter squadron. After shooting down nine more enemy planes, he was transferred to command Jagdstaffel 36. He would run his score to 25 enemy airplanes shot down and three observation balloons destroyed by 2 December 1917. He received Germany's highest award for valor, the Pour le Merite, on 8 October 1917. He was also transferred to a more prestigious command, Jagdstaffel 2, on 13 December 1917. On 6 January 1918, he was killed in action.

Early life 
Walter von Bülow-Bothkamp was born at Borby, now a part of Eckernförde in Schleswig-Holstein, Germany. He was the second eldest son in his family; there would be two younger brothers. All four of them would serve their country during World War I, with three of them dying in service. Friedrich and Walter were killed in action; Conrad died in a flying accident; only Harry survived the war, to become a Nazi general in latter years.

Walter Bülow-Bothkamp graduated from the Baccalaureate High School in Plon, Schleswig-Holstein in 1912. He then traveled for six months in Great Britain and Switzerland. After his wanderjahr he settled in to study law at the University of Heidelberg. He also joined a student corps there.

In August 1914, he and his younger brother Conrad joined Braunschweige Hussars Regiment 17 (the Deaths Head Hussars). In January 1915, he accompanied his unit to the front in southern Alsace.

Early Flying Service 

Walter von Bülow-Bothkamp was commissioned as a leutnant (lieutenant) in April 1915 and applied for pilot's training in the Luftstreitkräfte (German air service). Along with his brother Conrad, he trained in Replacement Division 5 in Hanover through 15 September 1915.

Bülow-Bothkamp was originally posted to Feldflieger Abteilung 22, which was an aviation squadron organized for aerial reconnaissance, observation, and direction of artillery on the Western Front. Although flying an AEG G.II two-seated observation plane, he managed to down enemy two seaters on consecutive days, 10 and 11 October 1915.

After an award of the Iron Cross First Class for his victories in October, his transfer to Flieger-Abteilung 300 took him to the Middle East to continue his reconnaissance duties in support of a German ally, the Ottoman Empire. He flew on the Palestinian front and was wounded on 13 June 1916. In a letter home from the hospital in Jerusalem, he joked about his shoulder wound being as inconsequential as a dueling scar suffered at university.

After his discharge from hospital, he won twice more near El Arish, with a fifth victory unconfirmed.

He earned a transfer to piloting fighter planes. He left Flieger-Abteilung 300 and joined a Prussian fighter squadron on the Western Front, Jagdstaffel 18. Bülow-Bothkamp shot down two enemy aircraft on 23 January 1917 and another the following day, to start his and his squadron's victory roll. By 10 May, when he transferred out of Jagdstaffel 18, his total stood at 13. He had been awarded both the Royal House Order of Hohenzollern and the Kingdom of Saxony's Military Order of Saint Henry while with the squadron.

Appointed to Leadership 

He was then appointed Commanding Officer of Jagdstaffel 36. He promptly shot down two French observation balloons at Bouvancourt on 21 May 1917. A hip wound kept him from scoring for a while, before he began a steady accumulation of triumphs that would extend from 6 July to 2 December. During this stretch, on 8 October, after 21 victories, he was awarded the highest decoration of both Prussia and the German Empire, the Pour le Merite. On 29 October, he went on leave until 7 November, leaving Hans Hoyer in temporary command of the squadron.

On 2 December, he killed Lieutenant Harry G. E. Luchford of No. 20 Squadron RAF when he shot down his Bristol F.2 Fighter. This was Bülow-Bothkamp's 28th and final victory.

On 13 December 1917, he was transferred to being Commanding Officer of a more prestigious unit, Jagdstaffel 2, Oswald Boelcke's old unit. On 6 January 1918, Walter von Bülow-Bothkamp led his wingmen into a dogfight against No. 23 and No. 70 Squadrons of the Royal Flying Corps near Ypres. He did not survive. RFC aces Captain Frank G. Quigley and Captain William M. Fry are believed to be his conquerors.

Walter was buried in his family chateau's cemetery. He joined his brother Friedrich, killed in action in 1914. Within the year, Conrad would join them.

Decorations and awards
 Iron Cross of 1914, 1st class (October 1915) and 2nd class (April 1915)
 Pour le Merite (8 October 1917)
 Knight's Cross of the Military Order of Saint Henry

Endnotes

References

External links 
 http://www.theaerodrome.com/aces/germany/bulow-bothkamp2.php Accessed 18 October 2008.
 http://www.frontflieger.de/3buelow0t.html Accessed 18 October 2008.
 http://www.sero-papermodels.com/content.do?object=jasta.jasta18&page=page.jasta Accessed 18 October 2008.
 http://www.pourlemerite.org/  Accessed 18 October 2008.
 

1894 births
1918 deaths
Aviators killed by being shot down
German military personnel killed in World War I
German World War I flying aces
Luftstreitkräfte personnel
People from Eckernförde
People from the Province of Schleswig-Holstein
Prussian Army personnel
Recipients of the Iron Cross (1914), 1st class
Recipients of the Pour le Mérite (military class)
Military personnel from Schleswig-Holstein